Franklin Heck served in the California State Assembly for the 56th district from 1921 to 1923 and during World War I he served in the United States Army.

References

United States Army personnel of World War I
Year of birth missing
Democratic Party members of the California State Assembly
20th-century American politicians